The eighth season of the American reality talent show The Voice premiered on February 23, 2015 on NBC. Adam Levine, Blake Shelton, & Pharrell Williams returned as coaches. Christina Aguilera returned for her fifth season as coach after a two-season absence, replacing Gwen Stefani. Carson Daly returned as host for the eighth season.

Sawyer Fredericks was announced as the winner of the season, marking Pharrell Williams' first and only win as a coach.

Coaches and hosts
Christina Aguilera re-joined the show after two seasons of absence, joining Blake Shelton, Adam Levine, and Pharrell Williams. The advisors for this season included Lionel Richie for Team Pharrell, Meghan Trainor for Team Blake, Nick Jonas for Team Christina, and Ellie Goulding for Team Adam. Nate Ruess served as an advisor for all teams during the Knockouts.

Teams
 Color key

Blind auditions
The first phase of the competition, the Blind Auditions began airing when the season premiered on February 23, 2015. Adam Levine auditioned as a joke in episode three with the song "Tiny Dancer", with all four chairs turning (Pharrell turned Adam's chair). He "chose" Christina.

Color key

Episode 1 (Feb. 23)
The four coaches performed "Are You Gonna Go My Way".

Episode 2 (Feb. 24)

Episode 3 (March 2)

Episode 4 (March 3)

Episode 5 (March 4)
The fifth episode, titled "Best of the Blinds", was a recap of all the Blind Auditions broadcast up to that point.

Episode 6 (March 9)
The sixth episode included the last of the Blind Auditions as well as the first Battles.

The Battles
The Battles (from the second half of episode 6 to episode 9) consisted of two 2-hour episodes, one 1-hour and one special episodes each on March 9, 10, 16 and 17, 2015. Season eight's advisors are Ellie Goulding for Team Adam, Lionel Richie for Team Pharrell, Nick Jonas for Team Christina and Meghan Trainor for Team Blake.

Color key:

The Knockouts
For the Knockouts, Nate Ruess was assigned as a mentor for contestants in all four teams. After announcing Anthony Riley's withdrawal from the competition, Pharrell grouped three of his team members into one knockout, in which two contestants from the trio advanced and one being declared loser. Just like season five, the coaches can steal one losing artist. The top 20 contestants will then move on to the "Live Shows".

Color key:

Live shows
The live shows is the final phase of the competition, consisting of seven weeks starting on the playoffs and concluding on the season finale.

Color key:

Week 1: Live playoffs (April 6, 7 & 8)
The Live Playoffs comprised episodes 14, 15, and 16 (the results show). The top twenty artists perform for the votes, and the two artists per each team advances via public vote, while the bottom three artists compete for the coaches' save in the results show. Monday's performance featured Teams Blake and Pharrell, and Teams Adam and Christina for the Tuesday's performance.

Week 2: Top 12 (April 13 & 14)
The Top 12 performed on Monday, April 13, 2015, with the results following on Tuesday, April 14, 2015. The Instant Save returned once again this season, with the bottom three artists performing for a spot on the next round via the viewers' votes from Twitter, and is in play until the semifinals. Oklahoma country music star Reba McEntire, last seen on the show's first season as an advisor for Team Blake, returned to serve as a mentor for the top 12 contestants.

This week's iTunes multiplier bonuses were awarded for Sawyer Fredericks (#2), Kimberly Nichole (#3) and Meghan Linsey (#5).

Week 3: Top 10 (April 20 & 21)
The Top 10 performed on Monday, April 20, 2015, with the results following on Tuesday, April 21, 2015. Adam, Blake, Christina and Pharrell brought in Dave Stewart, Scott Hendricks, Mark Ronson and Ryan Tedder respectively to help in this week's coaching.

This week's recipients of the iTunes multiplier bonuses were Koryn Hawthorne (#3) and Fredericks (#4).

Week 4: Top 8 (April 27 & 28)
The Top 8 performed on Monday, April 27, 2015, with the results following on Tuesday, April 28, 2015. Most of the previous coaches from past seasons returned to advise the remaining artists: Usher was the Advisor for Team Adam, Gwen Stefani advised both Teams Pharrell and Christina, and Cee Lo Green advised Team Blake. Shakira was the only previous coach not to return, due to the recent birth of her second child, but she did record a video message that was aired during the live show.

iTunes bonus multipliers were awarded to Fredericks and (#2) and Joshua Davis (#4). This week's Instant Save was the closest in the show's history, with Carney being saved by only two votes behind runner-up Kent White.

Week 5: Top 6 (May 4 & 5)
The Top 6 performed on Monday, May 4, 2015, with the results following on Tuesday, May 5, 2015. In honor of Mother's Day, each artist performed one song on Monday celebrating "the mothers in their lives". This week eliminations is a single elimination and the bottom two artists faced the Instant Save.

iTunes multiplier bonuses were awarded to Fredericks (#3 and #10) and Linsey (#5).

Week 6: Semifinals (May 11 & 12)
The Top 5 performed on Monday, May 11, 2015, with the results following on Tuesday, May 12, 2015. Similar to the Quarterfinals, the bottom two artists compete for the Instant Save and one artist was eliminated. iTunes multiplier bonuses were awarded to Fredericks (#2 and #3) and Linsey (#5). Special guests in the audience included Anna Kendrick, Brittany Snow and Hailee Steinfeld from Pitch Perfect 2.

With the elimination of Carney, Aguilera no longer has any remaining artists on her team.

Week 7: Finale (May 18 & 19)
The Top four performed on Monday, May 18, 2015, with the final results following on Tuesday, May 19, 2015. Finalists performed an original song, a duet with the coach, and a solo song. As with previous seasons, there was no iTunes bonus multiplier applied to songs performed in the finale episodes; all iTunes votes received for the six weeks leading to the finale were cumulatively added to online, phone and app finale votes for each finalist. By the time voting ended, Fredericks charted at #2, #3, Linsey at #5, and Davis at #9 on iTunes.

Elimination chart

Overall
Color key
Artist's info

Result details

Team
Color key
Artist's info

Result details

Performances by guests/coaches

Artists' appearances in other media
DeAnna Johnson sang in the blind auditions for season five, her audition was not televised and she failed to turn any chairs. She has since been crowned Miss Georgia USA and appeared in the Miss USA pageant on Fox.
Meghan Linsey and her then fiancé, Joshua Scott Jones, won season two of the television talent show Can You Duet as the duo Steel Magnolia.
Koryn Hawthorne would go on to be nominated at the 61st Grammy Award for Best Gospel Performance/Song.
Sarah Potenza competed on sixteenth season of America's Got Talent. She was among the contestants who were not chosen to be in the Quarter-Finals.

Ratings
The season eight premiere was watched by 13.97 million viewers with a 4.1 rating in the 18–49 demographic. It was up from last season's premiere by 1.02 million viewers.  The season eight premiere was up 21% from the previous season's finale. The second episode retained 95% of viewers in P18-49 from the premiere episode, compared to just 79%, from the previous season.

References

External links

Season 08
2015 American television seasons